Saint-Ulric is a municipality in Quebec, Canada.

On January 12, 2000, the Village Municipality of Saint-Ulric and Parish Municipality of Saint-Ulric-de-Matane were merged to form the Municipality of Rivière-Blanche, renamed to Saint-Ulric on November 11, 2000.

Demographics

Population

Population trend (pre-merger):

 Canada Census 1996:
 Saint-Ulric (village): 754 (-1.8% from 1991)
 Saint-Ulric-de-Matane (parish): 945 (-3.8% from 1991)
 Combined Total: 1,699 (-2.9% from 1991)

 Canada Census 1991:
 Saint-Ulric (village): 768
 Saint-Ulric-de-Matane (parish): 982
 Combined Total: 1,750

Language
Mother tongue language (2021)

See also
 List of municipalities in Quebec

References

Incorporated places in Bas-Saint-Laurent
Municipalities in Quebec
Designated places in Quebec
Canada geography articles needing translation from French Wikipedia